Francesco Bolzoni (born 7 May 1989) is an Italian footballer who plays as a midfielder for Swiss club Rapperswil-Jona that competes in the third-tier Swiss Promotion League. He is a former Italy U21 international.

Club career

Internazionale
Bolzoni started out at San Colombano al Lambro before joining Inter's academy. Bolzoni has played for every academy team from the Esordienti (under-13) to the Primavera (under-20).

During the season 2006–2007, Bolzoni was part of the winning side, when the reserve won the Campionato Nazionale Primavera (under-20 Italian Championship).

He made his first-team debut on 1 February 2007, playing 26 minutes of 2006–07 Coppa Italia) semi-final return leg against Sampdoria at the Stadio Giuseppe Meazza.

On 19 September 2007, Bolzoni, along with Esposito and Puccio, was selected for the first time in the 20-men squad for the 2006–07 UEFA Champions League match against Fenerbahçe. However, he failed to make his debut in the UEFA Champions League, on that day. In the following match against PSV Eindhoven he came on as a substitute for Santiago Solari in the 70th minute, making his first UEFA Champions League appearance.

On 12 December, during an away match against PSV Eindhoven, Bolzoni started his first UEFA Champions League match, and also played the whole 90 minutes. The game ended in 1–0 win for Internazionale.

Bolzoni renewed his contract with the club until 30 June 2012 in 2008.

On 24 May 2009, in a match against Cagliari he made his Serie A debut for Inter coming in as substitute for Cristian Chivu.

Genoa
In July 2009, it was announced that Bolzoni had signed for Genoa along with Leonardo Bonucci for €3M each as part of the deal that saw Thiago Motta sign for Internazionale for €10 million.

In August 2009, he was loaned to Frosinone for €200,000.

Siena
In July 2010, Siena signed Bolzoni on loan for €400,000 with an option to acquire 50% of his economic rights, fact that occurred on 22 June 2011, for €1,050,000. On 23 June 2012 Siena bought him outright for another €425,000.

Palermo
On 31 July 2013, Bolzoni left Siena's pre-season camp and completed the transfer to Palermo on the next day, for €1 million in a 4-year contract.

Novara
On 1 February 2016, he was signed by Novara on a free transfer.

Spezia
On 31 August 2017 Bolzoni joined fellow Serie B club Spezia, with Daniele Sciaudone moved to opposite direction. Bolzoni was assigned number 7 shirt.

Bari
In September 2018, Bolzoni joined newly refounded Serie D club Bari as a free transfer.

Loan to Imolese
On 2 September 2019, he joined Serie C club Imolese on loan.

Loan to Lecco
On 15 January 2020 he moved to Lecco. The loan was extended for the 2020–21 season on 1 September 2020.

Return to Bari
Upon his return from loan, Bolzoni did not make any appearances for Bari in the first half of the 2021–22 season, and on 26 January 2022 his contract with the club was terminated by mutual consent.

Rapperswil-Jona
On 28 July 2022, Bolzoni signed with Rapperswil-Jona in the third-tier Swiss Promotion League.

International career
On 5 October 2007, Pierluigi Casiraghi called up Bolzoni, although still 18 years old, to form part of the Italy U-21 national team for the matches against Croatia and Greece.

On 21 November 2007, he made his debut for the Italy U-21 national team, in a qualification match against Faroe Islands but did not make the final 23-man squad for the tournament.

Honours
Inter Youth team
 Campionato Nazionale Primavera (Under-20 Italian Championship)
 Winner : 2006–07
 Runner-up : 2007–08
 Torneo di Viareggio
 Winner : 2008

References

External links
  Francesco Bolzoni Profile at www.palermocalcio.it

1989 births
People from Lodi, Lombardy
Sportspeople from the Province of Lodi
Footballers from Lombardy
Living people
Italian footballers
Association football midfielders
Italy youth international footballers
Italy under-21 international footballers
Inter Milan players
Frosinone Calcio players
A.C.N. Siena 1904 players
Palermo F.C. players
Novara F.C. players
Spezia Calcio players
S.S.C. Bari players
Imolese Calcio 1919 players
Calcio Lecco 1912 players
FC Rapperswil-Jona players
Serie A players
Serie B players
Serie C players
Serie D players
Swiss 1. Liga (football) players
Swiss Promotion League players
Italian expatriate footballers
Expatriate footballers in Switzerland
Italian expatriate sportspeople in Switzerland